Algeria (ALG) competed at the 1987 Mediterranean Games in Latakia, Syria.

Medal summary

Medal table

References

International Mediterranean Games Committee

Nations at the 1987 Mediterranean Games
1987
Mediterranean Games